Very long-chain acyl-CoA synthetase is an enzyme that in humans is encoded by the SLC27A2 gene.

The protein encoded by this gene is an isozyme of long-chain fatty-acid-coenzyme A ligase family. Although differing in substrate specificity, subcellular localization, and tissue distribution, all isozymes of this family convert free long-chain fatty acids into fatty acyl-CoA esters, and thereby play a key role in lipid biosynthesis and fatty acid degradation. This isozyme activates long-chain, branched-chain and very long chain fatty acids containing 22 or more carbons to their CoA derivatives. It is expressed primarily in liver and kidney, and is present in both endoplasmic reticulum and peroxisomes but not in mitochondria. Its decreased peroxisomal enzyme activity is in part responsible for the biochemical pathology in X-linked adrenoleukodystrophy.

See also
 Solute carrier family

References

Further reading

Solute carrier family